The 2015 Appalachian State Mountaineers football team represented Appalachian State University in the 2015 NCAA Division I FBS football season. They were led by third-year head coach Scott Satterfield and played their home games at Kidd Brewer Stadium in Boone, North Carolina. This season was the Mountaineers second season in the Sun Belt Conference, and their first as a full, bowl-eligible member of the Football Bowl Subdivision. They finished the season 11–2, 7–1 in Sun Belt play to finish in second place. They were invited to their first ever bowl game, the Camellia Bowl, where they defeated Ohio.

Schedule
Appalachian State announced their 2015 football schedule on February 27, 2015. The 2015 schedule consisted of six home and away games in the regular season. The Mountaineers hosted Sun Belt foes Arkansas State, Georgia Southern, Louisiana–Lafayette, and Troy, and travelled to Georgia State, Idaho, Louisiana–Monroe, and South Alabama.

Schedule source:

Game summaries

Howard

at Clemson

at Old Dominion

Wyoming

at Georgia State

at Louisiana–Monroe

Georgia Southern

Troy

Arkansas State

at Idaho

Louisiana–Lafayette

at South Alabama

Ohio–Camellia Bowl

References

Appalachian State
Appalachian State Mountaineers football seasons
Camellia Bowl champion seasons
Appalachian State Mountaineers football